America's Funniest People is an American reality show on ABC that debuted on May 13, 1990 as a 30 minute television special America's Funniest... Part II, aired after the popular America's Funniest Home Videos. The green-lit series, then named America's Funniest People for the fall season, aired as a weekly half-hour prime time series from September 9, 1990, to August 28, 1994. It was hosted by Dave Coulier and Arleen Sorkin from 1990 to 1992. Tawny Kitaen replaced Sorkin in 1992. The announcer was Ernie Anderson. Dan Slider composed the theme song, which was performed by Peter Hix.

Format 
The format was similar to America's Funniest Home Videos, with the main difference that while America's Funniest Home Videos spent the majority of its time with accidental follies captured on tape, America's Funniest People focused on people intentionally trying to be funny, doing things such as telling jokes, doing impressions, singing, dancing, performing scripted material, attempting wacky stunts, pulling pranks, etc.

Like America's Funniest Home Videos, America's Funniest People featured a contest for funniest video, with the first prize winner receiving $10,000 and the 2nd and 3rd prize winners receiving $3,000 and $2,000 respectively. However, unlike Funniest Home Videos, which relied on studio audience voting to determine the winner, Funniest People selected its winners via telephone vote for its first five episodes, with the winners announced at the beginning of the next show; the show switched to having the studio audience select the winner afterwards, like its parent show. Also, unlike its parent show, there was no $100,000 grand prize finale.

Jackalope vignettes 
Originally known as "Tiny the Jackalope", or simply "The Jackalope", Jackalope sketches involved a creature attacking people by playing mean tricks on them (usually as punishment for people who had been mean themselves). Typically, the main target was a muscular man who absolutely despises the creature. The character's catchphrase was, "Fast as fast can be, you'll never catch me!" Host Dave Coulier did the voices for all characters in the Jackalope skits, which were played at a faster pace than other clips. The Jackalope was later renamed "Jack Ching Bada-Bing" in a "Name the Jackalope" contest.

This Old Shack 
A series of shorts that center around bumbling, clumsy carpenters, Joe-Bob and Randy-Bob, who use haywire methods to remodel houses.

Alien Shorts 
The Alien Shorts feature claymation miniature aliens who attempt to take over planet earth, but are constantly defeated by humankind's daily routines and habits.

Whiz on Wheels 
A recurring bit scripted as advertisement for the fictional Whiz on Wheels company, who perform services improperly and too fast to be good, causing more damage than they fix. They claim to be faster and cheaper than competing companies.

Comedy Mini-Movies by Dennis M. Miller and Jason Cardwell 
Dennis and Jason first produced an Indiana Jones spoof for America's Funniest Home Videos called "Pasadena Jones and the Satire of Doom". They then moved over to America's Funniest People for its initial season and produced a dozen videos which aired every other week. Although there were several videos with original characters, there were also spoofs of Rambo, James Bond, and Dirty Harry.

In the Dirty Harry spoof, Harry was downgraded to a video store detective. After chasing a suspect all over San Francisco, Harry finally cornered him in an alley. He reaches into his jacket, and slowly pulls out a VHS movie, asking the suspect "What I have here is a VHS video cassette, the most popular format in the world, and the question is, punk... did you rewind it?"

"Dunk Your Parents" 
For the show's 1993-1994 season, a new game show segment called "Dunk Your Parents" was added, hosted by Skip Trippendale (Coulier), in which a kid contestant could drop one of their parents into a pool of water, similar to a dunk tank. The kid chose the parent that they wanted to dunk. That parent then sat on a chair over the water. The parent was then asked a trivia question, usually involving a list — for example, "Name the seven dwarfs in Snow White and the Seven Dwarfs". If the parent answered the question correctly, the other parent had to take their place. If not, that parent remained in the chair. The climax of the segment was when the child pushed a button to release the seat out from underneath the parent, dropping them into the water below.

On some occasions, instead of a question, the parent would have to complete a Beat the Clock-esque stunt (but these were often nearly impossible to complete).

"Prank Patrol" 
When the show changed format and became The New America's Funniest People for the 1993-94 season, a new segment was added called the Prank Patrol. 5 kids would run around various parks and locations near Los Angeles, performing pranks on unsuspecting visitors. The Prank Patrol consisted of Brady Bluhm, Elena Epps, Raushan Hammond, Lindsay Ridgeway, and Lance Robinson. Pranks consisted of exploding ice cream cones, a man in a gorilla suit, a squirting drinking fountain, a remote control bat, an exploding trash can, and a hand in a jar of candy. Sean Daly was also in this episode

"Weird Sports" 
A recurring segment centering on bizarre sporting events such as Rocky Mountain Rock Fishing, Pizza Diving, Meatball Miniature Golf, Brazilian Bicep Bowling, etc. Actor/comedian Dan Sachoff had hosted this segment in later seasons.

"Cool Ways to Scare Your Mom" 
A recurring segment centering on the comedy duo Schwartz and Chung where Caleb Chung (inventor of the Furby) would teach viewers a simple sight gag and then show it to his mom, played by Gary Schwartz. The segment was first introduced by Full House actress Jodie Sweetin. The reactions were mad, homemade special effects. The duo appeared 11 times in the run of the show.

Production 
The 30 minute pilot for the series was produced in May 1990. It was called (and the special and series originally promoted as) America's Funniest... Part II, as it was shown immediately after America's Funniest Home Videos. The host of the show, Dave Coulier, like Funniest Home Videos host Bob Saget, was also one of the stars of the popular sitcom Full House which was airing at the same time as the series. The original series logo from the pilot episode was a slight revamp of the AFHV logo. When the pilot proved successful, the series went into full production in the fall as America's Funniest People. In future airings, the pilot's title card was retroactively changed to reflect the new permanent name and logo of the show, though a careful viewer would still notice America's Funniest... Part II branding behind the studio audience.

Full House'''s Mary-Kate and Ashley Olsen made guest appearances, as they also did on America's Funniest Home Videos. The bulk of their visits to People took place once their collective popularity with kids and pre-teens took off. Their most notable appearance was in the fall of 1992, when they plugged their first single, "Brother for Sale", from the release of Mary-Kate and Ashley: Our First Video.

It was produced by Vin Di Bona Productions, even though at the end of the show's closing credits, it credited the company as Gina Communications, Inc. The show was originally taped at The Prospect Studios (then known as the ABC Television Center), on the same soundstage used for America's Funniest Home Videos at the time. The show traveled to Universal Studios Florida in 1992, taping five shows at the Animal Actors Stage.

In 1992, Sorkin was dismissed by Vin Di Bona. In response, Sorkin filed a lawsuit against Di Bona, claiming that she was dismissed from the show due to her race, after ABC Chairman Dan Burke had suggested to Di Bona that Sorkin be replaced by an African-American or a person of another ethnic minority. Sorkin sought $450,000 for lost earnings, and an additional unspecified amount for harm to her professional reputation and emotional injury. Sorkin additionally claimed that after she denounced the move as unfair, Di Bona changed plans and hired new cohost Tawny Kitaen, who was white.

During the 1992-1993 season, the entire production moved to Universal Studios Florida. The start of the 1993-94 season modified the show's title to The New America's Funniest People, with an updated logo, and production moving back to Los Angeles, originating from Hollywood Center Studios. This reflected the addition of new themed segments, some special guests, and the new practice of having a guest co-host (usually a star from another ABC series) join Coulier and Kitaen each week. However, these changes were not enough to improve the show's failing ratings, and it was cancelled at the end of that season. The network continued to air repeats until late-August.

During the latter half of the show's run, and for at most a year after it was canceled, short 30-second segments from America's Funniest People ran in commercial breaks during ABC's Saturday morning lineup. These would usually consist of excerpts from longer segments, usually featuring young kids telling jokes or engaging in stunts.

The show's premise would later integrate to AFV.

 Syndication 

Repeat episodes of America's Funniest People'' aired on TBS from 1998 to 2003.

Seasons

References

External links 
 Variety - The New America's Funniest People TV Shows Review
 

1990 American television series debuts
1994 American television series endings
1990s American reality television series
American Broadcasting Company original programming
Television series by Disney–ABC Domestic Television
English-language television shows
American television spin-offs